Trbušnica is a village located in the municipality of Loznica, western Serbia. According to the 2011 census, the village has a population of 836 inhabitants. A border crossing between Serbia and Bosnia and Herzegovina is located in the village. The youngest soldier of World War I, Momčilo Gavrić was born here. Also, Luka Kojić lives here.

References

Populated places in Mačva District